Kenneth Jewett (October 2, 1880 – November 28, 1944) was an American boxer. He competed in the men's lightweight event at the 1904 Summer Olympics.

References

External links
 

1880 births
1944 deaths
American male boxers
Olympic boxers of the United States
Boxers at the 1904 Summer Olympics
Sportspeople from Fitchburg, Massachusetts
Lightweight boxers